Aerotransporte de Carga Unión S.A. de C.V., commonly known as AeroUnion, is a scheduled cargo airline headquartered in Hangar Zone G at Mexico City International Airport in Mexico City, Mexico. It operates cargo services within and between Mexico and the United States.

History
The airline was founded on March 5, 1998, but only in November 2000 an application to the United States Department of Transportation for the right to carry cargo between the USA and Mexico was filed. Flight operations were launched in July 2001, with services to the Los Angeles key market being commenced on January 21, 2006.

On March 11, 2014, Avianca Holdings announced that its subsidiary Avianca Cargo entered into a purchase agreement to acquire 100% of the non-voting shares and 25% of the voting shares of AeroUnion.

Destinations

AeroUnion operates the following scheduled services:

Fleet

Current fleet
The AeroUnion fleet consists of the following aircraft (as of March 2023):

Former fleet
The airline previously operated the following aircraft:

Accidents and incidents
On April 13, 2010, AeroUnion Flight 302, from Mexico City to Monterrey, crashed during landing approach on a highway near Monterrey International Airport, killing all five people on board, as well as a driver in a car that was hit by.

On October 27, 2016, an Airbus A300B4F (registered XA-MRC), operating from Mexico City International Airport to Guadalajara Airport, had to make an emergency landing at the Santa Lucía Air Force Base due to a fire in the turbine. Upon landing, the 10 crew members came to the aid of various rescue bodies. There were no injuries.

On December 10, 2018, the same A300B4F, XA-MRC, suffered a nose gear collapse while being towed across the ramp in the maintenance area of Mexico City International Airport.

See also
List of airlines of Mexico

References

External links

Official website 
Official website 

Airlines of Mexico
Cargo airlines of Mexico
Airlines established in 1998
Airlines of Mexico City
Mexican companies established in 1998